Paractinoceras is a genus of long straight slender actinocerid nautiloid with siphuncular segments in the early stages like those of Actinoceras, becoming narrower in the later stages of the chambered phragmocone like those in Ormoceras.  As with Kochoceras and Floweroceras  Paractinoceras is considered a separate genus within the Actinoceratidae, distinct from Actinoceras.

References

 Flower R.H 1968, The First Great Expansion of the Actinoceroids, New Mexico Bureau of Mines and Mineral  Resources  Memoir 19 Part I, Socorro NM 
 

Actinocerida
Prehistoric nautiloid genera
Paleozoic life of Manitoba
Paleozoic life of the Northwest Territories
Paleozoic life of Nunavut